Dennis G. Kovar from the U.S. Department of Energy, was awarded the status of Fellow in the American Physical Society, after they were nominated by their Division of Nuclear Physics  in 1996, for his work on direct reactions, which provided precise spectroscopic information of importance for our understanding of single-particle states near doubly-magic 208Pb, and which established the angular-momentum dependence in heavy-ion transfer reactions.

References 

Fellows of the American Physical Society
American physicists
Living people
Year of birth missing (living people)